Karo is a group of Nilotic tribes that straddles the Nile in the Republic of South Sudan and is predominately found in  Central Equatoria State, and as far South as Uganda and South-West as Democratic Republic of the Congo. Karo comprises Yangwara, Bari, Pojulu, Kuku (or BaKuku in Uganda), Mundari and Kakwa. They have been erroneously called Bari-speakers by C. G. Seligman, a British ethnologist, whose first contact with Karo was likely with the Bari during British colonial rule in Sudan. Seligman categorised the six ethnic groups as "Bari Speakers" for research purposes as he did so for "Dinka Speakers, Nuer Speakers, Lou Speakers, Moru Speakers and the Azande Speakers". These other groups however, have not adopted the categorization coined by G. Seligman for ethnic identification. It is only the "Bari Speakers" who are erroneously defined as speakers of Bari language.

The term "Bari-speakers" is not considered representative of the six ethic groups that occupy present Central Equatoria Region of Sudan. "Bari Speakers" linguistically connotes speaking of the Bari dialect without being part of the Bari ethnic group. This categorization has tended to alienate people in the Yangwara, Pojulu, Kuku, Kakwa and Mundari communities. It was not until July 1986 that a young junior officer of the rank of lieutenant in the Sudan Peoples Liberation Movement/Army, by name of Lemi Logwonga Lomuro, discovered for himself that the categorization of people as speakers of a language was not only limited to the "Bari Speakers" in the Central Equatoria Region of Sudan. Lt Logwonga realised that his comrades in the SPLM/SPLA from other groups, including the Moru, Nuer, Dinka and the Lou speak different dialects, yet they are not described as "Speakers" of one of those dialects. The Dinka for example, speak more than seven dialects and are only known as "Dinka or Jieng", not Dinka speakers. The Nuer too, speak more than seven dialects. This discovery triggered Lt Logwonga to consult with some of his fellow members of various communities from Central Equatoria in the SPLM/SPLA to promote a common identity for the six groups comprising the Bari, Pojulu, Kuku, Yangwara, Kakwa and Mundari. Initial consultations took place in Bongo SPLA Military Training Centre where pioneers endorsed the concept of 'KARO COMMUNITY' to unite the people of Central Equatoria, and encouraged Lt Logwonga to continue to pursue such a noble idea. Among those who took interest in the endeavour were 1st Lt. Martin Kenyi Ladu Bara, 1st Lt. Gwido Mori, Lt. Moses Lubari, Lt. Michael Yokwe Soro, Lt. Moses Arapa Lo-Gune, and Lt. Augustino Luwate. The pioneers advocated for all-inclusive "Karo Community" of people. This idea was to gain ground when in December 2000, General Logwonga introduced the Karo project to Dr. Luka Monoja Tombekana, to solicit for his support in London. Dr Monoja wholeheartedly blessed the initiative and pledged to contribute to its advancement. Since then 'Karo' as a unifying identity for the six ethnic groups (stated above) continues to evolve.

"Karo" means "relative" and it appeals to the relatedness of the Karo people. Indeed, there is a broad base movement within Karo to redefine the whole tribal affiliation and groups as Woti Karo or Karo people. Woti Karo share a common culture in addition to language, which has been called Kutuk na Karo ('mother tongue').

References
 Seligman, C. G., and Seligman, B. Z., Pagan Tribes of the Nilotic Sudan. George Routledge & Sons Ltd., London, 1932.
 Collins, Robert O., Land beyond the Rivers, the Southern Sudan, 1898–1918. Yale University Press, New Haven and London, 1971.
 Regib Yunis, Notes on the Kuku and other minor tribes inhabiting Kajo-Keji District, Mongalla province. SNR VII (1) 1936 pp 1– 41.

Nilotic peoples
Ethnic groups in South Sudan